Bogorodskoye is a rural locality (a selo) and the administrative centre of Bogorodsky Selsoviet, Blagoveshchensky District, Bashkortostan, Russia. The population was 466 as of 2010. There are 7 street.

Geography 
Bogorodskoye is located 28 km north of Blagoveshchensk (the district's administrative centre) by road. Sorvikha is the nearest rural locality.

References 

Rural localities in Blagoveshchensky District